Non-Violence, also known as The Knotted Gun, is a bronze sculpture by Swedish artist Carl Fredrik Reuterswärd of an oversized Colt Python .357 Magnum revolver with its muzzle tied in a knot.

History
Carl Fredrik Reuterswärd made this sculpture after the murder of John Lennon, with whom Reuterswärd was acquainted. When learning of the murder he stayed up all night to work on the piece, inspired by the idea of making a knot on the gun the murderer Mark David Chapman had used. He had previously done pieces of knotted pencils, such as Medium’s Memory in Kristianstad in 1977. During 1980-1981 Reuterswärd did one prototype of a life size gun in plaster and one in bronze. These are now kept in the collection of Museum of Sketches for Public Art in Lund.

The oversized public version of the piece was planned for John Lennon’s memorial Strawberry Fields in Central Park. This sculpture was made 1984, but when the memorial was opened in 1985 Reuterswärd opted not to have it placed there, citing fears it would be stolen. In 1988, the Luxembourg government bought and donated it to the United Nations. The sculpture was moved right outside of the headquarters of the UN. Here it was interpreted not only a memorial for John Lennon, but as a symbol against violence and war anywhere in the world.

Following the unveiling of the original sculpture, Reuterswärd did a range of replicas of Non Violence for places around the world, numbering about 30 sculptures. About half of these are in Sweden.

Aside from the public pieces, Reuterswärd made plenty of variations of the sculpture in smaller or life sized scale. In 2012 he donated a collection of pieces like this to the city museum in Landskrona.

Since 1993, the sculpture has been the symbol of The Non-Violence Project (NVPF), a nonprofit organization that promotes social change through violence-prevention education programs.
In 2011, Ringo Starr unveiled his own brightly colored version of The Knotted Gun that he created. Later, more colour versions were made by Paul McCartney, Yoko Ono and other celebrities.

For the 30th anniversary of the sculpture, the NVPF and the art dealer Hansen Fine Art launched a foot-long version of the sculpture sold online. The United Nations Postal Administration issued three stamps depicting the sculpture. In 2019, the NVPF worked with the Dalai Lama to make 150 small-scale Non-Violence sculptures from melted confiscated guns (Humanium Metal), including one copy signed by the Dalai Lama and auctioned at Sotheby's.

Locations 

There are currently more than 30 copies of the sculpture around the world. They are located in places such as :

See also
International Day of Non-Violence
Nonviolence

References

1985 sculptures
Works by Swedish people
Monuments and memorials to John Lennon
United Nations art collection
Anti-war sculptures
Bronze sculptures in Manhattan
Outdoor sculptures in Manhattan
Bronze sculptures in France
Bronze sculptures in China
Sculptures in Germany
Sculptures in South Africa
Sculptures in Sweden
Sculptures in Switzerland